is a Japanese futsal player who plays for Córdoba CF Futsal and the Japanese national futsal team.

Career 
On 6 February 1997, he was born in Tokyo, Japan. He joined Fugador Sumida's youth team in 2014, aged seventeen. He made his senior debut with the top team on September 27, 2014, in F.League. In 2015–16, he won the F.League New Player Award. In July 2018, he moved to ElPozo Murcia FS B in the Spanish Second Division on loan.

In August 2019, he joined Thái Sơn Nam in the Vietnam Futsal League on loan. He won the top scorer of the 2019 AFC Futsal Club Championship. In January 2020, he moved to Córdoba CF Futsal in the Spanish First Division on loan.

Title 
 Individual
 F.League New Player Award (1) : 2015-16
 AFC Futsal Club Championship Top Scorer (1) : 2019

 Team
 AFC Futsal Asian Cup (1) : 2022 AFC Futsal Asian Cup
 AFC Futsal  Club Championship : Third place 2019

References

External links

1997 births
Living people
Japanese men's futsal players
People from Tokyo